Robert Gunn Bremner (December 17, 1874 – February 5, 1914) was an American newspaper publisher and Democratic Party politician who represented New Jersey's 7th congressional district in the United States House of Representatives from 1913 to 1914.

Biography
Bremner was born in Reiss, Caithness, Scotland on December 17, 1874. His family migrated to Orangeville, Ontario, Canada, where he attended public schools and worked on his family's farm and as a school teacher.

He moved to New York City in 1893, and worked as a carpenter and electrician.  He later worked as a reporter for several newspapers in Paterson, New Jersey.

He served with the Second Regiment of New Jersey Volunteer Infantry during the Spanish–American War.

In 1902 Bremner became the owner and publisher of the Passaic Herald.

Bremner was elected as a Democrat to the Sixty-third Congress, serving from March 4, 1913 until his death.

In December, 1913 Bremner checked into a hospital in Baltimore, Maryland to be treated for cancer of the neck and shoulder.  He did not recover, and died in Baltimore on February 5, 1914. He was interred at Laurel Grove Memorial Park in Totowa, New Jersey.

See also
 Politics of New Jersey
 List of United States Congress members who died in office (1900–49)

External links
 
 Robert Gunn Bremner at The Political Graveyard
 
 Robert Gunn Bremner, Late a Representative from New Jersey. 1915. U.S. Government Printing Office.

1874 births
1914 deaths
Democratic Party members of the United States House of Representatives from New Jersey
Scottish emigrants to the United States
Canadian emigrants to the United States
19th-century American politicians